Álvaro Gonzalo Rudolphy Fontaine (born May 24, 1964, in Viña del Mar, Chile) is a Chilean actor who works in theater, soap operas and film. He has obtained numerous awards, among them the Apes Prize in 2001 to the best Actor in his role in Amores de mercado and the Altazor Prize in 2008 for his role in Alguien te mira.

He was raised in Concepción, where he studied at Alianza Francesa. When his parents divorced, he returned to his birth city along with his mother and two siblings.

After a year studying French, and another one of Engineering at the Pontifical Catholic University of Valparaíso, he finally opted for theater.
 
He studied theater in the academy by Gustavo Meza. He worked for Canal 13 and later on TVN. In the majority of his roles he has been the main character or one of the principal characters of the plot.

He made his debut in Matilde Dedos Verdes, in Canal 13.

His first main role was in Estúpido Cupido from TVN, where he played Aníbal Donoso who fell in love with the main character Mónica Tagle, played by Carolina Fadic.

His great performance in the soap opera Amores de mercado with the lead role of twins Pelluco and Rodolfo.

He also appeared in Alguien te mira, portraying a psychopath killer. And his most recent role is the vampire "Domingo Vrolok" in the nocturnal soap opera named Conde Vrolok.

His best friend is fellow actress Sigrid Alegría.

On November 15, 2008, he married the journalist Catalina Comandari at a beach resort in Horcón.

Films

Telenovelas

References

External links 
 

1964 births
Chilean male telenovela actors
Pontifical Catholic University of Valparaíso alumni
Chilean male film actors
Chilean people of French descent
Living people
People from Viña del Mar
Chilean male television actors